Symbol from Greek language sunbolon that means a seal, signet ring, legal bond or warrant. From sunballein, to throw together, compare. A name used beginning in the fourth or fifth century, in the East and West, for the declaratory creeds, especially the Apostles' Creed, perhaps suggesting the pact made between the baptismal candidate and God, but more probably deriving from the baptismal confession of faith as a sign and symbol of belief in the Triune God.

References 

Eastern Christian liturgy